General Sir Edward Earle Gascoyne Bulwer  (22 December 1829 – 8 December 1910) was a British Army officer who became Lieutenant Governor of Guernsey.

Military career 
Educated at Trinity College, Cambridge, Bulwer was commissioned into the Royal Welch Fusiliers in 1849. He served in the Crimea War and took part in the Battle of Alma in 1854. He then took part in the Relief of Lucknow during the Indian Mutiny. He was appointed Assistant Inspector of Reserve Forces in Scotland in 1865, Assistant Adjutant-General for Recruiting in Scotland in 1870 and Assistant Adjutant-General for Auxiliary Forces at Army Headquarters in 1873. He went on to be General Officer Commanding Chatham District in 1879, Inspector-General of Recruiting at Army Headquarters in 1880 and Deputy Adjutant-General to the Forces in 1886.

He was appointed Lieutenant Governor of Guernsey in 1889. He retired in 1896. In retirement he was Colonel of the Royal Welch Fusiliers.

Family 
In 1863 he married Isabella Buxton; they had one son and four daughters. Edward Bulwer was the nephew of Henry Bulwer, 1st Baron Dalling and Bulwer, nephew of Edward Bulwer-Lytton, 1st Baron Lytton and brother of Henry Ernest Gascoyne Bulwer.

References 

1829 births
1910 deaths
Military personnel from Norfolk
Alumni of Trinity College, Cambridge
British Army generals
British Army personnel of the Crimean War
British military personnel of the Indian Rebellion of 1857
Knights Grand Cross of the Order of the Bath
People from Heydon, Norfolk
Royal Welch Fusiliers officers